Ivan Sunara (born 27 March 1959, in Drniš) is a Croatian former basketball player who competed for Yugoslavia in the 1984 Summer Olympics.

References

1959 births
Living people
Competitors at the 1983 Mediterranean Games
Croatian men's basketball players
Croatian expatriate basketball people in Germany
Yugoslav men's basketball players
Yugoslav expatriate basketball people in Germany
Olympic basketball players of Yugoslavia
Basketball players at the 1984 Summer Olympics
Olympic bronze medalists for Yugoslavia
Olympic medalists in basketball
KK Cibona players
KK Split players
KK Zadar players
KK Krka coaches
Mediterranean Games gold medalists for Yugoslavia
Medalists at the 1984 Summer Olympics
Skyliners Frankfurt coaches
Sportspeople from Drniš
Mediterranean Games medalists in basketball
KK Zadar coaches
KK Helios Domžale coaches